Elen Yesayan (born 17 February 2003) is an Armenian swimmer. She competed in the women's 100 metre breaststroke event at the 2017 World Aquatics Championships.

References

External links
 

2003 births
Living people
Armenian female breaststroke swimmers
Place of birth missing (living people)